Marie E. Hayes, a native of Raheny, Ireland, one of few early female medical graduates from Ireland in 1904, became a medical missionary and chief of Rewari Hospital in India part of the Cambridge Mission to Delhi.  Hayes died unexpectedly from a pneumonia in 1908. Known for her work, passion, and character, a ward was built in her name in St Stephen's Hospital, Delhi.

Early life 
Marie Elizabeth Hayes was born on May 17, 1874 in Glebe House, Raheny, Dublin, Ireland.  She was the oldest daughter of Reverend Canon F.C. Hayes and his wife Annabella Wilson.  Marie's father was a Rector at Raheny Parish beginning in 1873 and her mother founded the Mothers' Union in Ireland to promote the well-being of families.  Her parents' devotion to helping the less fortunate was passed along to Marie. Young Marie was guarded, but had a clear interest in missionary work and expressed this interest to her parents and her brother early on in her life.

Education 
Marie started working towards her medical degree in 1897 at Alexandra College in Dublin, Ireland.  She continued her education at Catholic University School of Medicine, which was associated with Royal University.  Because gender exclusion in higher education, Catholic University was her only option in receiving a medical degree.  At Catholic University she achieved "high status" with a silver medal in surgery, pathology, and obstetrics.  She was one of few female students to achieve this status.  She completed a residency in Coombe Hospital, Dublin.  She was then invited to return to Coombe as a clerk based on her impact as a resident.  She later received a 6-month residency in Mater Misericordiae Hospital, Dublin, one of the few hospitals that accepted female residents.  She was one of only five female candidates to pass the final degree examination in May, 1904 and was the only female student to obtain an "Upper Pass."  She was conferred with MB BCh BAO degrees.  After obtaining her degree, in preparation for missionary service in India, she returned to school at the London School of Tropical Medicine for 3 months,  completed a temporary residency in the S.P.G. missionary hostel in Wandsworth, and studied Urdu.  After finishing her studies, Dr. Hayes worked as a locum tenens in the Belfast Infirmary for a few months before beginning her mission in India.

Call to missionary service 
Marie's missionary call was attributed to the role her father's and mother's religious service played in her life. Her mother reported Marie first expressed interest in missionary work in 1887, at 13 years old, and never lost her compulsion for service.  Her motive in obtaining her medical degree was that so she could become a medical missionary.  She worked her entire life to serve the Mission.

When she was home in Ireland, Marie was a dedicated member of the active laity at All Saints Church in Raheny.  Her mother and father were also active members of the church.  In India, Dr. Hayes continued to preach as a member of a Christian Mission.

Missionary service 
In 1905, Dr. Hayes started her journey to her first mission post at Cambridge Mission to Delhi, India.  She was accepted into the Society for the Propagation of the Gospel in Foreign Parts (S.P.G.) in January of that year.  As soon as Dr. Hayes arrived in Punjab, India, her services were essential and her workload was intense due to understaffing in the hospital.

The mission was composed of 3 major hospitals.  The first and largest hospital of the mission, St. Stephen's Hospital in Delhi, was opened in 1885.  This was the first mission hospital for women and children in Delhi.  Dr. Hayes worked under Jenny Muller who was the first full-time doctor at this hospital. 70 miles north of Delhi, the mission had its second hospital in the city of Karnal.  70 miles southwest of Delhi, the mission had its third hospital in Rewari.  Dr. Hayes eventually led the Rewari Hospital.  St. Stephen's Hospital was rebuilt in its present site in Tis Hazari, Old Delhi beginning in December 1906.

Dr. Hayes spent 26 months in India working for the Mission before an early death.  However, her short period of service was described as "impactful".

Death 
Dr. Hayes died at the age of 33. She had contracted pneumonia at Christmas in 1907 and returned to Delhi on New Year's Day for a celebration.  The persistent infection led to death on Saturday January 3, 1908. Her funeral service was held at St. Stephen's Church in Delhi and her burial service was held at Indian Christian Cemetery.  When word of her death got to her home in Ireland, a memorial service was held at All Saints' Church, Raheny, on January 6, 1908.

Legacy and impression 

Dr. Hayes was known for a significant impact on the mission and for paving the way for many women who wished to pursue medical degrees and residencies.  After her death, a memorial fund was established in her name in Dublin.  Contributions for the fund came from friends, family, and coworkers living in Dublin, England, and India.  This fund was used to finance the construction of a ward in the new St. Stephen's Hospital in Delhi.  This ward was named "The Marie Hayes Ward" for her service to the hospital in Delhi. She is additionally recognized in the hospital chapel with memorial brass name plate and separately a prayer desk inscribed with the words (in Urdu):

"For the service of God in prayer and in memory of Dr. Marie Hayes and what work she did. Placed here by nurses of Delhi, Karnal and Rewari. Year of Jesus, 1908."

In her home village of Raheny, a memorial Celtic cross was built.  The engraved cross currently stands beside St. Assam's Church and graveyard in the center of the village.

Dr. Haye's impact was recognized by Jenny Muller at St. Stephen's and Rev. S. S. Allnutt, Head of Cambridge Delhi Mission for her work, spirit, and devotion to God. Rev. S.S. Allnutt wrote an introduction to At Work : Letters of Marie Elizabeth Hayes when her mother chose to publish it.  He spoke very highly her character and contribution to the mission.

After Marie's death, her mother decided to compile and publish all the letters that Marie had sent home during her work on the Cambridge Mission to Delhi. Published as At Work: Letters of Marie Elizabeth Hayes, her mother hoped these letters would inspire others to continue Marie's work.

References 

1874 births
People from Raheny
Irish women medical doctors
Christian medical missionaries
Female Christian missionaries
Irish Anglican missionaries
Anglican missionaries in India
British Anglican missionaries
1908 deaths